Near passerines and higher land-bird assemblage are terms of traditional, pre-cladistic taxonomy that have often been given to tree-dwelling birds or those most often believed to be related to the true passerines (order Passeriformes) owing to morphological and ecological similarities; the group corresponds to some extent with the Anomalogonatae of Alfred Henry Garrod.

Biology
All near passerines are land birds. However, molecular data does not support the traditional arrangement; it is now clear that "near passerines" and "higher landbirds" are not synonymous.

Per Ericson and colleagues, in analysing genomic DNA, revealed a lineage comprising Passeriformes, Psittaciformes and Falconiformes.

Orders

Pterocliformes (sandgrouse), Columbiformes (pigeons), Cuculiformes (cuckoos), Caprimulgiformes (nightjars), and Apodiformes (swifts, hummingbirds) are no longer recognized as near passerines. The true near-passerine families are the Psittaciformes (parrots), the Falconiformes (falcons), and the Cariamiformes (seriemas). These three orders, together with the Passeriformes make up the Australaves. Sister to the Australaves are the Afroaves (see Telluraves).

The phylogenetic relationships between the orders are:

See also
List of birds

References

Further reading
 

Birds by classification